Storrington is a small town in the Horsham District of West Sussex, England, and one of two in the civil parish of Storrington and Sullington. Storrington lies at the foot of the north side of the South Downs.  it has a population of around 4,600. It has one main shopping street (High Street). The A283 road runs directly through the village and connects Storrington to Steyning in the east and Pulborough in the west.

History
Storrington is listed in the Domesday Book as "Estorchestone", meaning a place well known for storks. A charter to hold a regular market on Wednesdays was granted by Henry IV in 1400, together with permissions for three fairs during the year, on Mayday, Wednesday of Whit week and the Feast of Martin on 11November. Tanning and blacksmithing were also important industries and only in the 20th century did these roles fade away. Rabbit breeding was another significant industry reflected in a number of local place names including 'The Warren', 'Warren Hill', 'Sullington Warren' and 'Warren Croft'. This working/small industry background has however, left little behind architecturally. Nikolaus Pevsner, noted only the small door in Browns Lane, the church, and the Dominican convent known as the Abbey to be historically significant.

Community
Since 1945 Storrington has expanded with a variety of housing projects which enlarged the village. It is possible to be in open countryside in a few minutes from the town centre when walking towards the downs or one of the commons.

Storrington's  main supermarket is Waitrose. There are a variety of shops including delicatessens, charity shops, butchers, clothes shops, coffee shops, hardware stores, estate agencies, two banks, restaurants, a museum and a post office and three public houses: The Moon, the Anchor Inn and the White Horse Inn.

Mainline train services are from Pulborough or Amberley. Trains to London take an hour and a quarter and terminate at Victoria. Trains to Gatwick Airport take about 25 minutes.

From the village centre there is walking access to the  trail, the South Downs Way. From Chantry Hill or Kithurst Hill there are views across the English Channel to the south and opposite, to the North Downs. On a clear day you can see the Isle of Wight.

Sport and leisure

Sport and leisure facilities include a recreation ground with football and cricket pitches and a leisure centre. Storrington has a Non-League football club Storrington F.C., who play at the recreation ground.

Storrington is thinly disguised as the home of the home team in Hugh de Sélincourt's 1924 novel The Cricket Match, complete with chestnut trees and duck pond. In later editions a cartoon map of the village is used as end pages. John Parker wrote what was effectively a sequel in The Village Cricket Match in 1977.

Landmarks
St Joseph's Hall in Greyfriars Lane is a Grade II listed  former residence of the Bishop of Arundel and Brighton. It was built as a private house for US businessman George Trotter in 1910, and then sold to a French religious order, the Norbertines. In 1956 it was used by Vincent and Nona Byrne as a home for refugees from the Hungarian uprising.

Parham Park, towards Pulborough, is a country house with rolling parkland with a large herd of maintained deer. It is open most weekends to visitors. There is also the private Edwin Lutyens built Little Thakeham nearby.

Places of worship include St Mary's on Church Street, which is the main Church of England place of worship, and the Priory of Our Lady of England on Monastery Lane, which is the Roman Catholic parish church of Storrington. The Roman Catholic bishops of Arundel lived nearby for a while. Other Christian denominations have places as well, including the Methodists and Jehovah's Witnesses.

Twinning
Storrington is twinned with the commune of Villerest in the Loire department of central France.

References

External links

Storrington Museum
Community website
Horsham District Council

Villages in West Sussex
Market towns in West Sussex
Horsham District